Biryani is a mixed rice dish originating among the Muslims of the Indian subcontinent. It is made with Indian spices, rice, and usually some type of meat (chicken, beef, goat, lamb, prawn, and fish), or in some cases without any meat, and sometimes, in addition, eggs and potatoes.

Biryani is one of the most popular dishes in South Asia, as well as among the diaspora from the region. Similar dishes are also prepared in other parts of the world such as in Iraq, Myanmar, Thailand, and Malaysia. Biryani is the single most-ordered dish on Indian online food ordering and delivery services, and has been labelled as the most popular dish overall in India.

Etymology
One theory states that it originated from birinj, the Persian word for rice. Another theory states that it is derived from biryan or beriyan, which means "to fry" or "to roast". It may alternatively be related to the Persian word bereshtan which also means "to roast (onions)", as the dish is often prepared by flavouring rice with fried onions and meat, besides mild spices. Persian was used as an official language in different parts of medieval India by various Islamic dynasties.

Origin
The exact origin of the dish is uncertain. In North India, different varieties of biryani developed in the Muslim centres of Delhi (Mughlai cuisine), Rampur, Lucknow (Awadhi cuisine) and other small principalities. In South India, where rice is more widely used as a staple food, several distinct varieties of biryani emerged from Hyderabad Deccan (where some believe the dish originated) as well as Tamil Nadu (Ambur, Thanjavur, Chettinad, Salem, Dindigal), Kerala (Malabar), Telangana, and Karnataka (Bhatkal) where Muslim communities were present.

According to historian Lizzie Collingham, the modern biryani developed in the royal kitchens of the Mughal Empire (1526–1857) and is a mix of the native spicy rice dishes of India and the Persian pilaf. Indian restaurateur Kris Dhillon believes that the dish originated in Persia, and was brought to India by the Mughals.

Another theory claims that the dish was prepared in India before the first Mughal emperor Babur conquered India. The 16th-century Mughal text Ain-i-Akbari makes no distinction between biryanis and pilaf (or pulao): it states that the word "biryani" is of older usage in India. A similar theory, that biryani came to India with Timur's invasion, appears to be incorrect because there is no record of biryani having existed in his native land during that period.

According to Pratibha Karan, who wrote the book Biryani, biryani is of Mughal origin, derived from pilaf varieties brought to the Indian subcontinent by Arab traders. She speculates that the pulao was an army dish in medieval India. Armies would prepare a one-pot dish of rice with whichever meat was available. Over time, the dish became biryani due to different methods of cooking, with the distinction between "pulao" and "biryani" being arbitrary.

According to Vishwanath Shenoy, the owner of a biryani restaurant chain in India, one branch of biryani comes from the Mughals, while another was brought by the Arab traders to Malabar in South India.

There are various apocryphal stories dating the invention to Shah Jahan's time but Rana Safvi, the distinguished historian, says she could only find a recipe from the later Mughal period, from Bahadur Shah Zafar's time. It is not her claim that there was no biryani before that; just that she has not found a recipe. Other historians who have gone through texts say that the first references to biryani only appear around the 18th century.

Difference between biryani and pulao

Pilaf or pulao, as it is known in the Indian subcontinent, is another mixed rice dish popular in the cuisines of the Indian subcontinent, Central Asia, and Middle Eastern cuisine. Opinions differ on the differences between pulao and biryani, and whether actually there is a difference between the two.

According to Delhi-based historian Sohail Hashmi, pulao tends to be plainer than biryani, and consists of meat or vegetables cooked with rice with the bottom layered with potatoes or onions. Biryani contains more gravy (or yakhni), and is often cooked longer, leaving the meat (and vegetables, if present) more tender, and the rice more flavoured. Biryani is also cooked with additional dressings and often would have a light layer of socarrat at the bottom.

Pratibha Karan states that while the terms are often applied arbitrarily, the main distinction is that a biryani consists of two layers of rice with a layer of meat (and vegetables, if present) in the middle, while the pulao is not layered.

Colleen Taylor Sen lists the following distinctions between biryani and pulao:
 Biryani is the primary dish in a meal, while the pulao is usually a secondary accompaniment to a larger meal.
 In biryani, meat (and vegetables, if present) and rice are cooked separately before being layered and cooked together for the gravy to absorb into the rice. Pulao is a single-pot dish: meat (or vegetables) and rice are cooked separately and they are not mixed. However, some other writers, such as Holly Shaffer (based on her observations in Lucknow), R. K. Saxena, and Sangeeta Bhatnagar have reported pulao recipes in which the rice and meat are cooked together and then simmered for dum cooking until the liquid is absorbed.
 Biryanis have more complex and stronger spices compared to pulao. The British-era author Abdul Halim Sharar mentions the following as their primary difference: biryani has a stronger taste of curried rice due to a greater amount of spices.

Ingredients
Ingredients for biryani vary according to the region and the type of meat and vegetables used. Meat (of either chicken, goat, beef, lamb, prawn or fish) is the prime ingredient with rice. As is common in dishes of the Indian subcontinent, vegetables are sometimes also used when preparing biryani. Corn may be used depending on the season and availability. Navratan biryani tends to use sweeter, richer ingredients such as cashews, kismis and fruits, such as apples and pineapples.

The spices and condiments used in biryani may include fennel seeds, ghee (clarified butter), nutmeg, mace, pepper, cloves, cardamom, cinnamon, bay leaves, coriander, mint, ginger, onions, tomatoes, green chilies, and garlic. The premium varieties include saffron.

The main ingredient that usually accompanies the spices is chicken or goat meat; special varieties might use beef or seafood instead. The dish may be served with dahi chutney or raita, korma, curry, a sour dish of aubergine (brinjal), boiled egg, and salad.

Preparation styles: pakki versus kacchi biryani 
Biryani can be cooked using one of two styles/techniques, pakki ("cooked") and kacchi ("raw").
 In a pakki biryani, the rice, marinated meat, and any vegetables are partially ("three-quarters") cooked separately, before being combined into layers in a cooking vessel. Different layers of rice may be treated with different spices (e.g., with dissolved saffron or turmeric to give the rice different colours and flavours).The contents are then baked to complete the cooking and allow the flavours to combine. Alternatively, the components may be fully cooked, and then simply combined by layering before serving.
 In a kacchi biryani, layers of raw marinated meat are alternated in layers with wet, pre-soaked, raw rice (which may be treated with different spices as above), and cooked together by baking, or medium-to-low direct heat (typically, for at least an hour). Cooking occurs by a process of steaming from the ingredients' own moisture: the cooking vessel's lid is sealed (traditionally, with a strip of wheat dough) so that steam cannot escape (proper dum pukht).A yoghurt-based marinade at the bottom of the cooking pot provides additional flavour and moisture.  Potatoes often comprise the bottom layer (a technique also used in Iranian cuisine), because, with their natural moisture content, they brown well with less risk of getting burned accidentally. The lid is not opened until the dish is ready to serve. Kacchi biryani is technically much more demanding and time-consuming than pakki biryani, for the following reasons:
 The different ingredients—meat, rice, potatoes—have different cooking times: tender cuts of meat/chicken can be fully cooked well before the rice is done. To prevent this, many kacchi recipes use parboiled (semi-cooked) rice rather than raw rice. 
 If direct heat is used, there is a risk that the food layer in contact with the vessel bottom may get burned while the interior's contents are still raw. This risk is minimized by sustained baking with moderate heat or very slow cooking on low direct heat. This approach, however, increases cooking time considerably.
 One method is cooking the dish "blind", with the cooking vessel sealed, so one cannot monitor the cooking progress—it takes the understanding of the raw foods used, the heat required to cook those raw foods, and how the climate can affect the cooking process. Hence making kacchi biryani requires a seasoned hand.

Varieties

In the Indian subcontinent

There are many types of biryani, whose names are often based on their region of origin. For example, Sindhi biryani developed in the Sindh region of what is now Pakistan, and Hyderabadi biryani developed in the city of Hyderabad in South India.

Some have taken the name of the shop that sells it, for example: Haji Biriyani, Haji Nanna Biriyani in Old Dhaka, Fakhruddin Biriyani in Dhaka, Students biryani in Karachi, Lucky biryani in Bandra, Mumbai and Baghdadi biryani in Colaba, Mumbai. Biryanis are often specific to the Muslim communities where they originate; they are usually the defining dishes of those communities.

Ambur/Vaniyambadi biryani 
Ambur/Vaniyambadi biryani is a variety cooked in the neighboring towns of Ambur and Vaniyambadi in the Tirupattur district of the northeastern part of Tamil Nadu, which has a high Muslim population. It was introduced by the Nawabs of Arcot who once ruled the area. It is typically made with jeera samba rice.

The Ambur/Vaniyambadi biryani is accompanied by dhalcha, a sour brinjal curry, and pachadi or raitha (sliced onions mixed with plain curd, tomato, chilies, and salt). It has a distinctive aroma and is considered light on the stomach. The usage of spice is moderate and curd is used as a gravy base. It also has a higher ratio of meat to rice. Ambur-style biriyani is popular as street food all across South India.

Beef biryani 

Beef biryani, as the name implies, uses beef as the meat. In Hyderabad, it is famous as Kalyani biryani, in which buffalo or cow meat is used. This meal was started after the Kalyani Nawabs of Bidar came to Hyderabad sometime in the 18th century. The Kalyani biryani is made with small cubes of beef, regular spices, onions, and many tomatoes. It has a distinct tomato, jeera and dhania flavour. In Kerala, beef biryani is well known. The Bhatkali biryani is a special variant where the main ingredient is onion. Its variations include beef, goat, chicken, titar, egg, fish, crab, prawn, and vegetable biryani.

Bhatkali/Navayathi biryani 
This is an integral part of the Navayath cuisine and a specialty of Bhatkal, a coastal town in Karnataka. Its origins are traced to the Persian traders who left behind not only biryani but a variation of kababs and Indian breads. In Bhatkali biryani, the meat is cooked in an onion and green chili-based masala and layered with fragrant rice. It has a unique spicy and heady flavour, and the rice is overwhelmingly white with mild streaks of orange.

Though similar to those in Thalassery, this biryani differs with lingering after-notes of mashed onions laced with garlic. A few chilies and spices littered with curry leaves lends a unique flavour to Bhatkal biryani. No oil is used.

Bohri biryani 
Bohri biryani, prepared by the Bohris is flavoured with many tomatoes. It is popular in Karachi.

Chettinad biryani 
Chettinad biryani is famous in the Indian state of Tamil Nadu. It is made of jeeraka samba rice, and smells of spices and ghee. It is best taken with nenju elumbu kuzhambu, a spicy and tangy goat meat gravy. The podi kozhi is usually topped with fried onions and curry leaves.

Degh Ki biryani/Akhni Biryani of Parbhani 
Degh ki biryani is a typical biryani made from small cubes of beef or mutton. This biryani is famous in Parbhani and generally served at weddings.

The meat is flavoured with ginger, garlic, red chili, cumin, garam masala, fried onion and curd. This biryani is also known as kachay gosht ki biryani or dum biryani, where the meat is marinated and cooked along with short grain and fine rice. It is left on a slow fire or dum for a fragrant and aromatic flavour.

Delhi biryani 
The Delhi version of biryani developed a unique local flavour as the Mughal kings shifted their political capital to the North Indian city of Delhi. Until the 1950s, most people cooked biryani in their home and rarely ate at eateries outside of their homes. Hence, restaurants primarily catered to travellers and merchants. Any region that saw more of these two classes of people nurtured more restaurants, and thus their own versions of biryani. This is the reason why most shops that sold biryani in Delhi, tended to be near mosques such as Jama Masjid (for travellers) or traditional shopping districts (such as Chandni Chowk).

Each part of Delhi has its own style of biryani, often based on its original purpose, thus giving rise to Nizamuddin biryani, Shahjahanabad biryani, etc.  Nizamuddin biryani usually had little expensive meat and spices as it was primarily meant to be made in bulk for offering at the Nizamuddin Dargah shrine and thereafter to be distributed to devotees. A non-dum biryani, using many green chillies, popularized by the Babu Shahi Bawarchi shops located outside the National Sports Club in Delhi is informally called Babu Shahi biryani. Another version of Delhi biryani uses achaar (pickles) and is called achaari biryani.

Dhakaiya biryani 

The city of Dhaka in Bangladesh is known for selling Chevon Biryani, a dish made with highly seasoned rice and goat meat. The recipe includes: highly seasoned rice, goat meat, mustard oil, garlic, onion, black pepper, saffron, clove, cardamom, cinnamon, salt, lemon, doi, peanuts, cream, raisins and a small amount of cheese (either from cows or buffalo). Haji biryani is a favourite among Bangladeshis living abroad. A recipe was handed down by the founder of one Dhaka restaurant to the next generation. Haji Mohammad Shahed claimed, "I have never changed anything, not even the amount of salt".

Dhakaiya Kacchi Biryani is accompanied by borhani, a salted mint drink made of yogurt, coriander, mint and salt.

Dindigul biryani 
The Dindigul town of Tamil Nadu is noted for its biryani, which uses a little curd and lemon juice for a tangy taste.

Hyderabadi biryani 

Hyderabadi biryani is India’s most famous biryani; some say biryani is synonymous with Hyderabad. The crown dish of Hyderabadi Cuisine, Hyderabadi biryani developed under the rule of Asaf Jah I, who was first appointed as the governor of Deccan by the Mughal Emperor Aurangzeb. It is made with basmati rice, spices and goat meat. Popular variations use chicken instead of goat meat. There are various forms of Hyderabadi biryani, such as kachay gosht ki biryani or dum biryani, where goat meat is marinated and cooked along with the rice. It is left on a slow fire or dum for a fragrant and aromatic flavour.

Memoni/Kutchi biryani 
Memoni biryani is an extremely spicy variety developed by the Memons of Gujarat-Sindh region in India and Pakistan. It is made with mutton, dahi, fried onions, and potatoes, and fewer tomatoes compared to Sindhi biryani. Memoni biryani also uses less food colouring compared to other biryanis, allowing the rich colours of the various meats and rice (and vegetables, if present) to blend without too much orange colouring.

Kalyani biryani 
Kalyani biryani is a typical biryani from the former state of Hyderabad Deccan. Also known as the "poor man's"  Hyderabadi biryani, Kalyani biryani is always made from small cubes of buffalo meat.

The meat is flavoured with ginger, garlic, turmeric, red chili, cumin, coriander powder, and much onion and tomato. It is first cooked as a thick curry and then cooked along with rice. Then given dum (the Indian method of steaming in a covered pot).

Kalyani biryani is supposed to have originated in Bidar during the reign of the Kalyani Nawabs, who migrated to Hyderabad after one of the Nawabs, Ghazanfur Jang married into the Asaf Jahi family. Kalyani biryani was served by the Kalyani Nawabs to all of their subjects who came from Bidar to Hyderabad and stayed or visited their devdi or noble mansion.

Kolkata biryani 

Calcutta or Kolkata biryani evolved from the Lucknow style, when Awadh's last Nawab Wajid Ali Shah was exiled in 1856 to the Kolkata suburb of Metiabruz. Shah brought his personal chef with him. The Kolkata biriyani is characterized by the unique presence of potato in it, along with meat and egg ('dim' in Bengali). It is said that the Nawab, having is lost his kingdom, could not afford meat, so his chefs tried to compensate by adding potatoes. But serious historians have rejected this as a myth. When Wajid Ali Shah arrived in Kolkata, the potato was an exotic vegetable in India and the former Nawab of Awadh, being a connoisseur of great food encouraged their chefs to try new ingredients in the dish. The Kolkata biryani is much lighter on spices but high on flavours.

Rawther biryani 
This type of biryani is popular in the Palakkad and Coimbatore regions. This was most commonly prepared by Rawther families in Kerala and Tamil Nadu. This type of biryani is cooked in a different style. Goat meat is most commonly used and it is entirely different from Malabar biryani.

Sindhi biryani 

The exotic and aromatic Sindhi biryani is known in Pakistan for its spicy taste, fragrant rice, and delicate meat. Sindhi biryani is a beloved staple in food menus of Pakistani and Sindhi cuisine. Sindhi biryani is prepared with meat and a mixture of basmati rice, vegetables, and various spices.

Sri Lankan biryani 

Biryani was brought into Sri Lanka by the South Indian Muslims who were trading in the Northern part of Sri Lanka and in Colombo in the early 1900s. In Sri Lanka, it is Buryani, a colloquial word which generated from Buhari Biryani. In many cases, Sri Lankan biryani is much spicier than most Indian varieties. Side dishes may include acchar, Malay pickle, cashew curry and mint sambol.

Thalassery biryani 

Thalassery biryani is the variation of biryani found in the Indian state of Kerala. It is one of the many dishes of the Malabar Muslim community, and very popular.

The ingredients are chicken, spices and the specialty is the choice of rice called khyma. Khyma rice is generally mixed with ghee. Although a large number of spices such as mace, cashew nuts, sultana raisins, fennel-cumin seeds, tomato, onion, ginger, garlic, shallot, cloves and cinnamon are used, there is only a small amount of chili (or chili powder) used in its preparation.

A pakki biryani, the Thalassery biryani uses a small-grained thin (not round) fragrant variety of rice known as khyma or jeerakasala. The dum method of preparation (sealing the lid with dough [maida] or cloth and placing red-hot charcoal above the lid) is applied here to avoid scorched rice.

Outside the Indian subcontinent

Burma

In Myanmar (Burma), biryani is known in Burmese as danpauk or danbauk, derived from the Persian term dum pukht, which refers to a slow oven cooking technique. Danbauk is a mainstay at festive events such as Thingyan, weddings and donation feasts. Given danbauk's South Asian origins, danbauk restaurants and chains have traditionally been owned by Muslims, but in recent decades Buddhist entrepreneurs have entered the market.

Featured ingredients include: cashew nuts, yogurt, raisins and peas, chicken, cloves, cinnamon, saffron and bay leaf cooked in long-grain rice. In danbauk, chicken specially seasoned with a danbauk masala spice mix, is cooked with the rice. Danbauk is typically eaten with a number of side dishes, including a fresh salad of sliced onions, julienned cabbage, sliced cucumbers, fermented limes and lemons, fried dried chilies, and soup. In recent decades, danbauk restaurants have innovated variations, including "ambrosia" biryani, which features dried fruits and buttered rice.

Western Asia
In Iraq and in the states of the Persian Gulf, biryani (برياني: "biryani") is usually saffron-based with chicken usually being the meat or poultry of choice. It is popular throughout Iraq, especially in the Kurdistan Region.  Most variations also include vermicelli, fried onions, fried potato cubes, almonds, and raisins spread liberally over the rice. Sometimes, a sour/spicy tomato sauce is served on the side (maraq).

In Iran, during the Safavid dynasty (1501–1736), a dish called Beriyan Polo was made with lamb or chicken, marinated overnight—with yogurt, herbs, spices, dried fruits like raisins, prunes or pomegranate seeds—and later cooked in a tannour oven, then served with steamed rice.

Afghan biryani
A different dish called biryan is popular in Afghanistan. Biryan traces its origins to the same source as biryani, and is today sold in Afghanistan as well as in Bhopal, India. Biryan is prepared by cooking gosht and rice together, but without the additional gravy (yakhni) and other condiments that are used in biryani. The Delhi-based historian Sohail Hashmi refers to the biryan as midway between pulao and biryani.  Afghani biryani tends to use much dry fruit such as raisins and lesser amounts of meat, often cut into tiny pieces.

Indonesia

Nasi kebuli is an Indonesian spicy steamed rice dish cooked in goat meat broth, milk and ghee. Nasi kebuli is descended from kabuli palaw which is an Afghani rice dish, similar to biryani served in the Indian subcontinent.

Although Indonesia has authentic nasi kebuli, Indonesia also inherited and has local-style of biryani which is known as nasi biryani or nasi briyani. Nasi biryani is popular among and often associated as Acehnese, Arab Indonesian, Indian Indonesian and Malay cuisine.

Malaysia and Singapore

Nasi briyani dishes are very popular in Malaysia and Singapore. As an important part of Malaysian and Singaporean Indian cuisines, they are popularized through mamak stalls, hawker centres, and food courts as well as fine dining restaurants.

Mauritius 
Biryani dishes are very popular in Mauritius, especially at Muslim weddings and festivities. It is also widely available at street food places. Mauritian biryanis are often accompanied by an achaar (mango pickles), chilies and salads.

Philippines
Kapampangan cuisine of the Philippines (often in Pampanga) features a special dish called nasing biringyi (chicken saffron rice), that is typically prepared only during special occasions such as weddings, family get-togethers or fiestas. It is not a staple of the Filipino diet as it is difficult to prepare compared to other usual dishes. Nasing biringyi is similar to the nasi briyani dish of Malaysia in style and taste. A version that has merged with the Filipino version of the Spanish paella is known as bringhe.

South Africa
In the Cape Malay culture, a variation of biryani incorporates lentils as a key ingredient in the dish along with meat (usually beef, chicken, seafood or vegetables). The dish is made by cooking the rice and legumes and meat and gravy separately, then mixing it. Uncommonly, it is made using the dum-cooking method. The spices are similar to those used in the original Indian biryani.

Thailand

Biryani in Thailand is commonly known as khao mhok. It is commonly paired with chicken, beef or even fish and topped with fried garlic. The dish is common in Thai cuisine and is often served with a green sour sauce.

Similar dishes

Tehari 
Tehari, tehri and tehari are various names for the vegetarian adaptation of Biryani but are mainly classified as pulao. It was developed for the Hindu bookkeepers of the Muslim Nawabs. It is prepared by adding potatoes to the rice, as opposed to the case of biryani, where the rice is added to the meat. In Kashmir, tehari is sold as street food. Tehari became more popular during World War II, when meat prices increased substantially and potatoes became the popular substitute in biryani.

See also

 List of rice dishes
 Tehari
 Fried rice

References

External links
 
 

Andhra cuisine
Bahraini cuisine
Bangladeshi rice dishes
Beef dishes
Bengali cuisine
Burmese cuisine
Desi culture
Fish dishes
Gujarati cuisine
Hyderabadi cuisine
Mauritian cuisine
Indian chicken dishes
Indian meat dishes
Indian rice dishes
Indonesian rice dishes
Iraqi cuisine
Kurdish cuisine
Kuwaiti cuisine
Lamb dishes
Malaysian cuisine
Muhajir cuisine
Pakistani rice dishes
Punjabi cuisine
Sindhi cuisine
Singaporean cuisine
Sri Lankan chicken dishes
Sri Lankan lamb dishes
Sri Lankan rice dishes
Tamil cuisine
Telangana cuisine
Chicken and rice dishes
Nepalese cuisine
Goat dishes
Awadhi cuisine
Kerala cuisine